Sébastien Antoine Luc Salles-Lamonge (born 28 January 1996) is a French professional footballer who plays as a midfielder for Ligue 2 club Bastia.

Club career
Salles-Lamonge is a youth exponent from Stade Rennais. He made his first-team – and Ligue 1 – debut on 12 February 2016, starting and playing the entire first-half in a 1–0 home defeat of SCO Angers.

On 16 August 2016, months after signing a professional contract with Rennes, Salles-Lamonge joined Ligue 2 side Le Havre AC on loan for the season. On 18 August 2018, he moved abroad after signing a one-year contract with Deportivo de La Coruña and being assigned to the reserves in Segunda División B.

In May 2019 Salles-Lamonge returned to France, signing a one-year contract, with a further year option, with SC Bastia.

References

External links
 
 
 

1996 births
Living people
Sportspeople from Tarbes
Association football defenders
French footballers
France youth international footballers
Ligue 1 players
Ligue 2 players
Championnat National players
Championnat National 2 players
Championnat National 3 players
Segunda División B players
Stade Rennais F.C. players
Le Havre AC players
Deportivo Fabril players
SC Bastia players
French expatriate footballers
French expatriate sportspeople in Spain
Expatriate footballers in Spain